is a  railway station located in the city of Hirosaki, Aomori Prefecture, Japan, operated by East Japan Railway Company (JR East).

Lines

Station layout
Ishikawa Station has one ground level side platform and one ground-level island platform, connected to the station building by a level crossing. The station is unattended.

Platforms

History
Ishikawa Station was opened on July 7, 1916 as a station on the Japanese Government Railways (JGR). The JGR became the Japan National Railways (JNR) after World War II. With the privatization of the JNR on April 1, 1987, the station came under the operational control of JR East.

Surrounding area
Ishikawa Post Office
Gijukukōkōmae Station on the Kōnan Railway Ōwani Line

See also
 List of Railway Stations in Japan

External links

  

Stations of East Japan Railway Company
Railway stations in Aomori Prefecture
Ōu Main Line
Railway stations in Japan opened in 1916
Hirosaki